The Alan Weeks Trophy is awarded to the Best British Defenceman in the British Ice Hockey Leagues as voted by Ice Hockey Journalists UK.

The award is named after Alan Weeks who was a BBC Commentator for 45 years and Chairman of the Brighton Tigers ice hockey club from 1946 until 1965.

The trophy was first awarded in 1989 when it was won by Paul Hand of the Murrayfield Racers.

Past winners

See also
Man of Ice Awards

External links
Ice Hockey Journalists UK

British ice hockey trophies and awards
Ice Hockey Journalists UK
Awards established in 1989
1989 establishments in the United Kingdom